Alexey Salamini is an American coxswain. He won a gold medal at the 1999 World Rowing Championships in St. Catharines with the lightweight men's eight.

References

Year of birth missing (living people)
American male rowers
World Rowing Championships medalists for the United States
Coxswains (rowing)
Living people